Transition-metal allyl complexes are coordination complexes with allyl and its derivatives as ligands.  Allyl is the radical with the connectivity CH2CHCH2, although as a ligand it is usually viewed as an allyl anion CH2=CH−CH2−, which is usually described as two equivalent resonance structures.

Examples
The allyl ligand is commonly found in organometallic chemistry. Most commonly, allyl ligands bind to metals via all three carbon atoms, the η3-binding mode.  The η3-allyl group is classified as an LX-type ligand in the Green LXZ ligand classification scheme, serving as a 3e– donor using neutral electron counting and 4e– donor using ionic electron counting.  More common are complexes with allyl and other ligands.  Examples include (η3-allyl)Mn(CO)4 and CpPd(allyl).

Homoleptic complexes
 bis(allyl)nickel
 bis(allyl)palladium
 bis(allyl)platinum
tris(allyl)chromium
 tris(allyl)rhodium
 tris(allyl)iridium

Synthetic methods
Allyl complexes are often generated by oxidative addition of allylic halides to low-valent metal complexes. This route is used to prepare (allyl)2Ni2Cl2:
2 Ni(CO)4 + 2 ClCH2CH=CH2 →  Ni2(μ-Cl)2(η3-C3H5)2 + 8 CO
A similar oxidative addition involves the reaction of allyl bromide to diiron nonacarbonyl.  Oxidative addition route has been used for Mo(II) allyl complexes as well:

Other methods of synthesis involve addition of nucleophiles to η4-diene complexes and hydride abstraction from alkene complexes. Lastly allyl ligands are produced by salt metathesis reactions starting with allylmagnesium bromide or related allyl lithium reagents.

Chelating bis(allyl) complexes

1,3-Dienes such as butadiene and isoprene dimerize in the coordination spheres of some metals, giving chelating bis(allyl) complexes. Such complexes also arise from ring-opening of divinylcyclobutane.  Chelating bis(allyl) complexes are intermediates in the metal-catalyzed dimerization of butadiene to give vinylcyclohexene and cycloocta-1,5-diene.

Sigma-allyl ligands
Complexes with η1-allyl ligands (classified as X-type ligands) are also known. One example is CpFe(CO)2(η1-C3H5), in which only the methylene group is attached to the Fe centre (i.e., it has the connectivity [Fe]–CH2–CH=CH2).  As is the case for many other η1-allyl complexes, the monohapticity of the allyl ligand in this species is enforced by the 18-electron rule, since CpFe(CO)2(η1-C3H5) is already an 18-electron complex, while an η3-allyl ligand would result in an electron count of 20 and violate the 18-electron rule. Such complexes can convert to the η3-allyl derivatives by dissociation of a neutral (two-electron) ligand L.  For CpFe(CO)2(η1-C3H5), dissociation of L = CO occurs under photochemical conditions:
 CpFe(CO)2(η1-C3H5) → CpFe(CO)(η3-C3H5) + CO

Benzyl complexes

Benzyl and allyl ligands often exhibit similar chemical properties.  Benzyl ligands commonly adopt either η1 or η3 bonding modes. The interconversion reactions parallel those of η1- or η3-allyl ligands:
CpFe(CO)2(η1-CH2Ph) → CpFe(CO)(η3-CH2Ph) + CO
In all bonding modes, the benzylic carbon atom is more strongly attached to the metal as indicated by M-C bond distances, which differ by ca. 0.2 Å in η3-bonded complexes. X-ray crystallography demonstrate that the benzyl ligands in tetrabenzylzirconium are highly flexible. One polymorph features four η2-benzyl ligands, whereas another polymorph has two η1- and two η2-benzyl ligands.

Applications
In terms of applications, a popular allyl complex is allyl palladium chloride.  Allyl ligands are susceptible to nucleophilic addition, which can be useful in organic synthesis.

References

Organometallic chemistry
Transition metals
Allyl complexes
Coordination chemistry